The Fogarty Literary Award is an Australian award that was established in December 2018 by Fremantle Press in association with the Fogarty Foundation. It is a biennial award for an unpublished manuscript by a Western Australian writer aged 18 to 35 valued at AU$20,000. In addition, the winning author receives a publishing contract for their manuscript.

Award winners

Shortlists

2019 
 "Where the Line Breaks" by Michael Peregrine Burrows
 "The History of Mischief" by Rebecca Higgie
 "The Last Bookstore" by Emma Young

2021 
 "The Glass House" by Brooke Dunnell
 "A Horse Held at Gunpoint" by Patrick Marlborough
 "Old Boy" by Georgia Tree

References 

Australian literary awards
Awards established in 2018
Australian literature-related lists